Virginia James, also known as Virginia Manheimer and Virginia Gilder, is a self-employed investor and conservative donor.

Personal life and education
James grew up in Passaic, New Jersey and Levittown, Pennsylvania. While working as a secretary on Wall Street, she met her husband, Richard Gilder. The couple divorced in 1994. James lives in Lambertville, New Jersey. James graduated from Columbia University.

Political activity
James is Chairwoman of the Empire Foundation for Policy Research, founder of A Brighter Choice (ABC) Scholarships, and a member of the board of the Foundation for Education Reform and Accessibility. James and her ex-husband helped found the Empire Foundation, a conservative think tank, in 1991. James is a supporter of school vouchers. In 1996, James offered to pay for 90% of the private school tuition for any student of Giffen Memorial, an Albany primary school.

James is a co-founder of The Club for Growth, to which she donated $700,000 in 2008. James is on the leadership council of the Club for Growth. James donated $1 million in 2014, $500,000 in 2013, $1.2 million in 2012, and $350,000 in 2010 to the Club for Growth Action. James has also donated to George Pataki, Ted Cruz, Richard Mourdock, and Steve Lonegan. James was a major supporter of Let Freedom Ring, John Templeton, Jr.'s organization that opposed the election of Barack Obama in 2008. James donated $200,000 to Women Speak Out PAC, a project of the Susan B. Anthony List that opposed the re-election of Barack Obama. James donated $400,000 to All Children Matter, Dick Devos's school voucher advocacy group.

References

Living people
Year of birth missing (living people)